Adkins is a surname of English origin. Notable people with the surname include:

Adele Adkins (born 1988), British singer
Amanda Adkins (born 1974/1975), American politician and businesswoman
Amanda Adkins (born 1976), American swimmer
Bennie G. Adkins (1934–2020), United States soldier; recipient of the Medal of Honor
Bertha Adkins (1906–1983), American educator, political activist, public servant, and community leader
Betty Adkins (1938–2001), American politician
Betty Viana-Adkins (born 1971), Venezuelan bodybuilder
Bob Adkins (1917–1997), American football player
Brad Adkins (born 1973), American artist
Bradley Adkins (born 1993), American track and field athlete
Cecelia Adkins (1923–2007), American publisher
Charles Adkins (politician) (1863–1931), American politician
Charles Adkins (boxer) (1932–1993), American boxer
Damien Adkins (born 1981), Australian footballer
Dan Adkins (1937–2013), American illustrator
Sinbad (born David Adkins in 1956), American actor/comedian 
David E. Adkins, American businessman, pastor, and politician 
Derrick Adkins (born 1970), American sprinter
Dewey Adkins (1918–1998), American baseball player
Dick Adkins (1920–1955), American baseball player
Doc Adkins (1872–1934) American pitcher in Major League Baseball
Dorothy Adkins (1912–1975), American psychologist
Doug Adkins (born 1963), American country musician and songwriter
Elizabeth W. Adkins (born 1957), American archivist
George Adkins (1910–1976), New Zealand rugby player
Grady Adkins (1897–1966), American baseball player
Greg Adkins (born 1968), American football player and coach
Hasil Adkins (1937–2005), American musician
Homer Burton Adkins (1892–1949), American chemist
Homer Martin Adkins (1890–1964), Governor of Arkansas
James Adkins (born 1985), American baseball player
James A. Adkins (born 1954), Adjutant General of Maryland
James C. Adkins (1915–1994), American politician
James Edward Adkins (1867–1939), Irish organist and composer
Janet H. Adkins (born 1965), American politician
Jesse C. Adkins (1876–1955), American politician
Jim Adkins (born 1975), American singer and guitarist for the band Jimmy Eat World
John Rainey Adkins (1941–1989), American guitarist and songwriter
John Scudder Adkins (1872–1931), American architect
Jon Adkins (born 1977), American baseball player
Joseph Adkins, American politician
Lesley Adkins (born 1955), English writer and archaeologist
Margene Adkins (born 1947), American football player
Mark Adkins, lead vocalist of the band Guttermouth
Minnie Adkins (born 1934), American folk artist
Monty Adkins (born 1972), British composer
Nigel Adkins (born 1965), English footballer
Patricia Adkins Chiti (died 2018), English singer and musicologist
Patrick H. Adkins (1948–2015), American fantasy author
Robert Adkins (1626–1685), English minister
Rocky Adkins (born 1959), American politician
Roy Adkins (born 1951), English writer and archaeologist
Roy Francis Adkins (1947–1990), English gangster
Roy Adkins (American football) (1898–1975), American football player
Rutherford H. Adkins (1924–1996), American soldier
Ryland Adkins (1862–1925), English barrister, judge and politician 
Sally D. Adkins (born 1950), American judge
Sam Adkins (born 1955), American football player
Sam Adkins (born 1965), American mixed martial artist
Sam Adkins (born 1991), English footballer
Scott Adkins (born 1976), English actor and martial artist
Seth Adkins (born 1989), American actor
Spencer Adkins (born 1987), American football player
Steve Adkins (born 1964), American baseball player
Taylor Adkins, American translator (of François Laruelle & Félix Guattari) and Independent Researcher
Terry Adkins (1953–2014), American artist
Tom Adkins (born 1958), American political pundit, political writer, public speaker and real-estate investor
Tommy Adkins (born 1932), American football player
Trace Adkins (born 1962), American country singer-songwriter
W. J. Adkins (1907–1965), American educator
Walter Knight-Adkin (1880–1957), Anglican priest
Walter Scott Adkins (1890–1956), American geologist and paleontologist
Winthrop Adkins (1932–2015), Syrian-born American psychologist and educator

See also
Adkins, Texas, unincorporated community, United States
Justice Adkins (disambiguation)
Adkinson
Aitken (disambiguation)
Aitkin (disambiguation)
Atkins (disambiguation)
Atkinson (disambiguation)
Elkin (disambiguation)

References 

English-language surnames